The title of Count of Mansilla (Conde de Mansilla) originates from the 17th century. The first Count of Mansilla was Antonio Campuzano y Riva Herrera in 1689. Successive Counts have been involved in Spanish politics, especially during the 20th century. One member of the Campuzano family was in exile with the Count of Barcelona in Estoril, when the Count of Barcelona was forced to remain outside Spain after the Spanish Civil War. One of the Count's of Mansilla brothers fought alongside the Nationalist forces in the civil war, dying in la Batalla del Ebro.

The family estate is located in the province of Santander; however, the title originates from a town in the province of Leon known as Mansilla de las Mulas. This town was originally an important trading town, as it bordered with Aragon. Unfortunately, and in spite of many efforts to restore it to its former glory, the town now has fallen into disrepair.

They remain staunch supporters of the monarchy and have a close relationship with Juan Carlos I of Spain.